Lascov is a village and municipality in Bardejov District in the Prešov Region of north-east Slovakia.

History
The village was first mentioned in historical records in 1370.

It has a population of about 530 people.

Geography
The municipality lies at an altitude of 190 metres and covers an area of 5.347 km².

External links
 
https://web.archive.org/web/20080111223415/http://www.statistics.sk/mosmis/eng/run.html

Villages and municipalities in Bardejov District
Šariš